The 1982–83 Utah State Aggies men's basketball team represented Utah State University as a member of the Pacific Coast Athletic Association during the 1982–83 men's college basketball season. They received an at-large bid to the NCAA Tournament where they lost in the first round to Iowa.

Roster

Schedule and results

|-
!colspan=12 style=| Regular season

|-
!colspan=12 style=|PCAA tournament

|-
!colspan=12 style=|NCAA Tournament

Notes

References 

Utah State Aggies men's basketball seasons
Utah State Aggies men's basketball
Utah State Aggies men's basketball
Utah State
Utah State